Diana Ürge-Vorsatz is a Hungarian scientist. She is professor of Environmental Sciences at Central European University. She is the Director of the Center for Climate Change and Sustainable Energy Policy. She has published widely on environmental and energy studies, primarily climate change mitigation.

Ürge-Vorsatz was a coordinating lead author of both the Fourth and Fifth Assessment Reports (AR4 and AR5) of the Nobel Peace Prize-winning Intergovernmental Panel on Climate Change. She is the vice chair of IPCC Working Group III (WG III).

Early life 
Diana Ürge-Vorsatz was born in 1968 in Berlin. She grew up in Budapest, where she attended Radnóti Miklós High School.
From 1986-1992 Ürge-Vorsatz attended Eötvös Lóránd University of Sciences (ELTE) in Budapest, earning a master's degree in physics in 1982 with specialization in both Astrophysics and Environmental Physics.
During this time, Ürge-Vorsatz also studied as a visiting student at Brunel, the University of West London from 1990-1991, where she took graduate courses in environmental pollution science and conducted research in environmental physics. In the summer of 1992, following her Master's graduation, Ürge-Vorsatz attended a post-grad program in Environmental Science at Central European University. 

Ürge-Vorsatz was a Fulbright Scholar within the Energy and Resources Group at the University of California, Los Angeles and Berkeley. She earned her PhD in Environmental Science and Engineering from the University of California in 1996. Her dissertation is titled "Evaluating US Residential and Commercial Electricity Conservation Potentials: an Analysis of the Lighting Sector."

Career 
Ürge-Vorsatz became an associate professor at Central European University (CEU) in 2001, and a full Professor in 2007. Ürge-Vorsatz accepted the position of Director for the Center for Climate Change and Sustainable Energy Policy  (3CSEP) in 2007.

Ürge-Vorsatz has served on the Scientific Expert Group on Climate Change of the United Nation, and led work on the Global Energy Assessment of buildings.
She is the vice chair of the Intergovernmental Panel on Climate Change (IPCC) Working Group III (WG III).

Ürge-Vorsatz was a coordinating lead author of both the Fourth and Fifth Assessment Reports (AR4 and AR5) of the Nobel Peace Prize-winning Intergovernmental Panel on Climate Change. The Nobel Peace Prize was awarded jointly to the Intergovernmental Panel on Climate Change and Al Gore for their efforts to bring climate change information to the public.

Research
Ürge-Vorsatz's early country studies include the first comprehensive assessment of fuel poverty in Hungary.
A household is defined as "fuel-poor" if its inhabitants have to spend more than 10% of their income on fuel to maintain adequate living temperatures. As of 2010, an estimated 80% of Hungarian homes were fuel poor, according to this definition. Such people may have to choose between heat and other basic needs such as food. Fuel poverty is therefore only one aspect of a broader and inter-related range of deprivations.

Diana Ürge-Vorsatz and her colleagues consider synergies and possible trade-offs for the development of sensible economic policies. The design and use of buildings is a key factor in both fuel poverty and climate change mitigation and adaptation. Reducing and eliminating fuel poverty, and decreasing carbon emissions and the impacts of climate change, are potentially compatible goals. Policy approaches can include energy-efficiency programmes, subsidies, tariffs, coordinated governance, support for low carbon technologies, and traditional transfer policies. In many cases, decisions involve complicated tradeoffs: between what is possible now and what may be available in the future, and between immediate and longer term impacts of decisions. For example, they argue that income support schemes are at best temporary solutions, with a danger of locking households into continuing use of inefficient energy systems, without addressing underlying problems. In contrast, improving the energy performance of housing stock has the potential to lift households out of energy poverty and to provide co-benefits such as increased employment.
In terms of retrofitting existing buildings, it becomes important to consider whether immediately doable (but possibly less effective) interventions are a better or worse choice, given the urgency of addressing climate change and the possible effects of delays in waiting for future (but possibly more sustainable) solutions. By considering issues in terms of multiple objectives and multiple impacts, they hope to develop a viable ecosocial policy agenda that enables people to meet basic needs.

Co-benefits often account for a significant percentage of the evaluation of benefit from policy interventions (e.g. from 53% for renewable wind farms to 350% for thermal insulation). Ürge-Vorsatz notes that co-benefits are variously defined in the literature, and that methods for measurement and indicators used vary. Ürge-Vorsatz uses intent as a key distinction, defining co-benefits as a result of intentionally pursuing multiple objectives.  She notes that the valuation of co-benefits should include both net benefits and distributional effects.

Ürge-Vorsatz discusses the difficulties involved in obtaining reliable data and the importance of identifying and using measures that are relevant to achieving sustainable development goals (SDGs) in urban environments. She emphasizes the importance of both climate-friendly construction of buildings and  land-use management of agriculture and forestry for their potential climate-positive role. She also discusses the potential for individual action and the creation of "enabling conditions" that will help climate action to succeed.

Public engagement
Ürge-Vorsatz engages with the public through regular writing on environmental issues for Hungarian and European newsletters and newspapers. She participated in workshops such as the Fulbright Workshop on the Environment in San Francisco in 1994. She is the founder and moderator of HIX KÖRNYÉSZ, an electronic environmental science periodical.

Personal life 
In 1984, Ürge-Vorsatz won the Hungarian National Championship in orienteering.

Selected publications

Awards
 2009, Recipient of the "Példakép" Award as one of Hungary's role models,  Pannon Példakép (Role Model) Foundation.
 2008, Recipient of the Hungarian Presidential recognition "A Magyar Köztársasági Érdemrend Középkeresztje" (Medium Cross Medal of the Hungarian Republic)
Fulbright Fellowship, Academic Year 1993-94 and 1994-95.
 The Brief Award, 1990, UK.

References 

Eötvös Loránd University alumni
University of California alumni
Academic staff of Central European University
Intergovernmental Panel on Climate Change lead authors
Scientists from Budapest
Hungarian women scientists
Living people
1968 births